The Epping Forest (also known as the Alfred I. duPont Estate) was a historic,  estate in Jacksonville, Florida where a luxurious riverfront mansion was built in the mid-1920s by industrialist Alfred I. du Pont and his third wife, Jessie Ball du Pont. It was added to the U.S. National Register of Historic Places in 1973 and has been restored to its original grandeur as the home of the Epping Forest Yacht Club. On April 18, 2012, the AIA's Florida Chapter placed the Epping Forest Yacht Club on its list of "Florida Architecture: 100 Years. 100 Places".

du Pont history
Alfred I. du Pont was originally from Delaware and controlled the famous DuPont Chemical Company with his cousins, Pierre and Coleman. Over the years, their relationship deteriorated to the point where Alfred resigned from the family company in 1917. He created business ventures in Delaware and New York, but in 1925, cousin Pierre was named Delaware's Tax Commissioner. To prevent Pierre from sticking his nose into Alfred's property holdings and investments, Alfred decided to relocate to Jacksonville, Florida, a city he'd often heard his mother talk about when he was growing up.
Alfred and Jessie became legal residents of Florida and Alfred began a second career pioneering the development of sound banking practices and investing in transportation and the paper industry.  
The location Alfred chose for their permanent home was at Christopher Point, the widest spot on the St. Johns River, which provided an excellent area for his favorite pastime, yachting on his beloved  Nenemoosha, built in 1922.

It is primarily Mediterranean Revival, combining influences from Gothic, Spanish Renaissance and Baroque architectural. Jessie selected the furnishings; Alfred designed the formal English gardens and lion's head fountain. The estate was named in honor of Mary Ball Washington, George Washington's mother and Jessie's ancestor, whose Virginia plantation bore the same name. The duPonts estate hosted U.S. presidents, powerful men (Vanderbilt, Carnegie, etc.) and kings.
After Jessie Ball duPont died in 1970, Edward Ball, who was Jessie's brother, sold the property to his close friend and local businessman Raymond K. Mason, CEO of the Charter Company, who used the property as his family residence until 1984.

Epping Forest Yacht & Country Club

In 1984, Gate Petroleum Company purchased the   du Pont estate. The 11⅓ acres occupied by the mansion, gardens, boathouse and riverfront were restored to their original splendor and transformed into the Epping Forest Yacht & Country Club. 
The remaining property was developed into a gated community of ninety $1 million homes and 80 condominiums under the Epping Forest name. The last home was constructed in 1999.

References

External links
 Duval County listings at National Register of Historic Places
 Florida's Office of Cultural and Historical Programs
 Duval County listings
 Great Floridians of Jacksonville
 Epping Forest Yacht & Country Club

Buildings and structures in Jacksonville, Florida
History of Jacksonville, Florida
National Register of Historic Places in Jacksonville, Florida
Du Pont family residences
Houses in Jacksonville, Florida
Gated communities in Florida
Alfred I. du Pont
Gate Petroleum
Southside, Jacksonville
1927 establishments in Florida